Taner (from Turkish , "dawn", and , "man") is usually a Turkish masculine given name and surname.

It may also refer to Taner, a former imperial Chinese commandery.

Given name 
Ahmet Taner Kışlalı (1939−1999), political scientist, author and politician
Dany Bahar (born 1971), birth name Taner Bahar, Turkish chief executive
Taner Adu (born 1984), professional basketball player
Taner Akçam (born 1953), Turkish historian, sociologist and author
Taner Akyol (born 1977), Turkish bağlama player and classical music composer
Taner Ari (born 1987), Austrian footballer of Turkish descent
Taner Birsel (born 1959), Turkish film actor
Taner Ceylan (born 1967), German-born Turkish photo-realist artist
Taner Demirbaş (born 1978), Turkish footballer
Taner Gülleri (born 1976), Turkish footballer
Taner Öner (born 1971), Turkish women's football manager
Taner Sağır (born 1985), Turkish weightlifting champion
Taner Savut (1974 – c. 2023), Turkish sporting director and footballer
Taner Yalçın (born 1990), Turkish-German footballer
Taner Yıldız (born 1962), Turkish politician
Taner Yıldız (footballer) (born 1992), Turkish footballer

Surname 
Emre Taner (born 1942), Turkish civil servant
Görgün Taner (born 1959), Turkish musical festival director
Güneş Taner (born 1949), Turkish politician and former government minister
Haldun Taner (1915–1986), playwright
Rüya Taner, Turkish female pianists.
Seyyal Taner (born 1952), Turkish female singer and actress
Uğur Taner (born 1974), Turkish swimmer

Others
Kadıköy Haldun Taner Stage, a theatre in Kadıköy, Istanbul, Turkey

See also 
 Tanna (disambiguation)
 Tanner (disambiguation)
 Tanners (disambiguation)

Turkish-language surnames
Turkish masculine given names